Daniel McRorie (25 June 1906 – 26 July 1963) was a Scottish footballer who played as an outside right for clubs including Liverpool in the Football League.

McRorie started his career with Queen's Park Strollers, before he moved to Airdrieonians, Stenhousemuir, Alloa Athletic and then Morton, where he enjoyed a prolific scoring spell in the 1928–29 Scottish Division Two season (27 goals in 36 appearances) as the club gained promotion, followed by another in the top tier at the start of 1930–31 (18 goals from 13 games) which drew attention from English clubs.

He moved to Liverpool in November 1930 and made three appearances during his debut season; he played 25 out of 29 league matches during the 1931–32 season, but only made five appearances in the next season and was sold in 1933.

McRorie was selected once by Scotland, in a 1–1 draw with Wales in the 1930–31 British Home Championship. He also played once for the Scottish Football League XI.

References

Sources

1906 births
1963 deaths
Scottish footballers
Footballers from Glasgow
People from Gorbals
Airdrieonians F.C. (1878) players
Queen's Park F.C. players
Greenock Morton F.C. players
Alloa Athletic F.C. players
Liverpool F.C. players
Stenhousemuir F.C. players
Watford F.C. players
English Football League players
Rochdale A.F.C. players
Runcorn F.C. Halton players
Scotland international footballers
Association football outside forwards
Scottish Football League players
Scottish Football League representative players